Imani Michelle Dorsey (born March 21, 1996) is an American professional soccer player who currently plays for NJ/NY Gotham FC in the National Women's Soccer League (NWSL). She attended Our Lady of Good Counsel Catholic High School in Olney, Maryland and in college she played for Duke University.

College career

Duke University, 2014–2017
Dorsey played for Duke University from 2014–2017. She was named ACC Offensive Player of the Year in 2017 and was a semifinalist for the MAC Hermann Trophy. She finished her career ranked fourth all time in career goals at Duke.

Club career
In 2015 she played for the Washington Spirit Reserves in the W-League. She scored eight goals, helping the team win the W-League Championship. She was named W-League Rookie of the Year.

NJ/NY Gotham FC (formerly Sky Blue FC), 2018–present
Dorsey was selected by Sky Blue FC with the 5th overall pick in the 2018 NWSL College Draft. She joined the team in May after completing her degree at Duke University and was added to the active roster as a National Team Replacement Player on June 1, 2018. Dorsey received a full professional contract on June 15. On July 7 she scored her first NWSL goal against the Chicago Red Stars.

Dorsey was named 2018 NWSL Rookie of the Year. She scored 4 goals and 1 assist in 14 matches for Sky Blue. Dorsey is the second Sky Blue player to win rookie of the year, after Raquel Rodriguez won it in 2016.

Sky Blue FC was re-branded as NJ/NY Gotham FC preceding the 2021 NWSL season.

International career
On August 23, 2018, Dorsey was named to the United States U-23 team for the 2018 Nordic tournament.

Dorsey received her first senior call-up to the United States national team on October 31, 2019.

Career statistics

International

References

External links
 Sky Blue profile
 

Living people
1996 births
American women's soccer players
United States women's international soccer players
Duke Blue Devils women's soccer players
National Women's Soccer League players
People from Elkridge, Maryland
NJ/NY Gotham FC draft picks
NJ/NY Gotham FC players
Soccer players from Maryland
Sportspeople from the Baltimore metropolitan area
Women's association football forwards
African-American women's soccer players
21st-century African-American sportspeople
21st-century African-American women